Obselidia is a 2010 American drama film written and directed by Diane Bell, starring Michael Piccirilli, Gaynor Howe and Frank Hoyt Taylor. The film won two awards at the 2010 Sundance Film Festival: the Excellence in Cinematography award and the Alfred P. Sloan Prize.

Plot
On his quest to catalogue soon obsolete occupations, George (Piccirilli) a librarian joins forces with a silent film projectionist (Howe), and together they journey to Death Valley to interview a maverick scientist (Hoyt Taylor) who is predicting the imminent end of the world.

Cast
Michael Piccirilli – George
Gaynor Howe – Sophie
Frank Hoyt Taylor – Lewis
Chris Byrne – Mitch
Kim Beuche – Jennifer
Michael Blackman Beck – Paul
Linda Walton – Linda
Grant Mathis – Monk

Reception

The influential film critic Todd McCarthy wrote in Variety that it was "gentle, intelligent, gorgeously made and utterly eccentric."  It was widely acclaimed for its "sheer beauty" and for being "a true original."

Awards
 Excellence in Cinematography. Sundance 2010 Film Festival
 Alfred P. Sloan Feature Film Prize. Sundance 2010 Film Festival
 Juried Best Feature. Ashland Independent Film Festival 2010
 Alfed P. Sloan 2010 Grantees. TFI Sloan Filmmaker Fund 2010.

See also
Sundance Winner

References

Further reading
Variety
Ashland Film
Tribeca

External links 
 

2010 films
2010s English-language films
2010 drama films
American drama films
Alfred P. Sloan Prize winners
2010s American films